Guriaso or Muno is a language of Papua New Guinea. Only described in 1983, it appears to be distantly related to the Kwomtari and Nai languages. (See Senu River languages for details.) It is spoken in Guriaso ward, Amanab Rural LLG, Sandaun Province.

References

Sources
 

Languages of Sandaun Province
Guriaso–Yale languages